The Battle of Champtoceaux, often called the Battle of l'Humeau, was the opening action of the 23-year-long War of the Breton Succession, a dynastic conflict in the Sovereign Duchy of Brittany which became inevitably embroiled in the Hundred Years War between England and France. This battle should have decided the war at a stroke, as John of Montfort, the leader of one faction, was made prisoner.  However his wife, Joanna of Flanders, and young son John escaped imprisonment. Their escape and continued support from his ally, England, allowed continued resistance to flourish and eventually turn the tide.

Context: Dynastic Conflict
The War of the Breton Succession was highly political and revolved around conflicting claims. The dynastic conflict over the Sovereign Duchy of Brittany followed the death of John III, Duke of Brittany on April 30, 1341.  His inheritance was claimed by two members of the Breton House of Dreux, his half brother John of Montfort and his niece Joan. Joan's husband, Charles of Blois, who was also the nephew of King Philip VI of France. The French king was bound to support his nephew's claim by the politic of family dynastics in medieval Europe. He was not, however, prepared to endure an expanded war in the Breton peninsula. Brittany at this time was a foreign land where travel was fraught with difficulties and the language alien.  Philip VI encouraged John and Charles to come to terms on the succession. At this stage, Edward III, King of England stepped into the conflict offering troops and financial support to John of Montfort in exchange for homage from John for the fealty of Brittany. If successful, John would thereby confirm Edward's claim to be the rightful ruler of France. Ironically, in supporting John, whose claim to the Ducal throne rested on Salic law, Edward was jeopardising his own claim to the throne of France which deliberately ignored the same laws. The idea of English troops rampaging through Brittany and from there into Normandy and other parts of Northern France terrified Philip, and he was resolved to win the war before Edward's troops could arrive. John was not idle either, having taken flight from Paris days before his arrest for treason (for conspiring with Edward III); he arrived in Nantes to raise an army from his supporters.

Charles' advance
By the end of September 1341, Charles of Blois had 5,000 French soldiers, 2,000 Genoese mercenaries, and an unknown but large number of Breton soldiers in his army. He encamped his army at Angers in the Loire Valley. 

By the time Charles of Blois was ready to move at the start of October 1341, Montfort had captured and garrisoned most of the castles and towns in Eastern Brittany. Montfort's castle strongholds included the towns of Rennes, Dinan, and the fortified castle (chateau fort) which guarded the Loire Valley at Champtoceaux. Charles made this stronghold the first objective of the French army as they marched towards their eventual target, Nantes. Charles of Blois arrived near the castle on 10 October with part of his army and laid siege to it before the remainder of the force arrived. This army was moving more slowly but its presence was already causing a number of John's supporters alarm. Mindful of the speed with which supporters disappeared in medieval dynastic struggles, John was forced to act, scraping together a band of followers and riding to the relief of Champtoceaux.

Battle of Champtoceaux

The attempted relief of Champtoceaux was a disaster for John of Montfort. His forces were strung out in a dozen garrisons and thus he could only scrape together a handful of men from Nantes to join his forces for this particular effort. This force was not big enough to challenge Charles' vanguard and was dwarfed by the large French army behind him. John could not expect English reinforcements in Brittany before the New Year. John halted at a small farmstead named l'Humeau, three miles from Champtoceaux, expecting it to be garrisoned by a small body of his supporters who could inform him of Charles' positions. To their mutual shock, he found Charles himself and almost overwhelmed his bodyguard. Charles barricaded himself in the farmhouse's tower and defeated all efforts by John's men to break in. For two days the two rivals engaged each other in the surreal circumstances; repeated efforts to gain access by John were driven off by Charles' defensive position. Meanwhile, the French army crawled ever closer. Supporters of John came to aid him and a series of bloody and confused skirmishes occurred around the head of the French column; these skirmishes failed to blunt the steady progress of Blois' army towards Nantes.

Siege of Nantes
Eventually John conceded defeat at Champtoceaux and rode as fast as he could for Nantes, pursued by French cavalry which had finally caught up with the action at l'Humeau. He had lost many of his supporters and mercenaries around Champtoceaux, which fell on 26 October after the fact of John's flight became known. When John arrived at Nantes, he received a hostile reception from the townsmen who reacted to the defeat at Champtoceaux and the losses there; they agreed to support him further only if he promised them that he would surrender should no relief arrive for the city within a month. A series of sallies by the Montfortists followed in the coming days; the French army responded and began its assaults on outlying forts held by John's forces. Captured defenders were executed by the French within sight of the city walls and discontent grew within the city to such a degree that John was having difficulty finding men to accompany his attacks on the French lines. Finally at the end of October a sally ended in disaster when John's mercenaries deserted at the height of battle and left the contingent of townsmen to be annihilated by a superior French force; some of the captured Montfortists were beheaded and their heads were thrown into the town with a catapult. John was forced to surrender by the irate city council on 2 November, and he was imprisoned in the Louvre in Paris.

Aftermath
In quick succession, John's allies and holdings in Brittany disappeared either through desertion or direct assault by the French army. During the winter, Charles captured all of Eastern Brittany, and then in the spring most of Western Brittany. This left only the port of Brest in the hands of John's wife, Joanna of Flanders, and a few English adventurers led by Walter Manny. It was at the Battle of Brest in July 1342 that the promised English reinforcements finally arrived, and the tide of war turned yet again and not for the last time. 

John of Montfort was released in 1343 as a result of the truce of Malestroit, but confined to his lands east of Brittany. He eventually escaped French custody in March 1345, fled to England, then returned to Brittany, made an unsuccessful attempt to regain Quimper, and died in September 1345. His infant son, raised in England, was still free and would continue the war once he reached adulthood. John's son eventually defeated Charles at the Battle of Auray in 1364, ending the war.

Notes

References

Sumption, Jonathan, The Hundred Years War, Vol 1, Trial by Battle, 1990, 
A.H. Burne, The Crécy War, 1955,  

Champtoceaux
Battles in Pays de la Loire
History of Maine-et-Loire
1341 in Europe
1340s in France
Champtoceaux
Champtoceaux
War of the Breton Succession